Walton is an unincorporated community in Van Zandt County, Texas, United States. According to the Handbook of Texas, the community had a population of 35 in 2000. It is located within the Dallas/Fort Worth Metroplex.

History
Walton was named for an early settler. It was originally in Henderson County until 1848. The first settlers came as early as 1865. A post office was established at Walton in 1875 and remained in operation until 1905. After that, it was sent from Athens. A Grange chapter was established here in 1876. At its most prosperous peak, the community had three churches, general stores, a blacksmith shop, cotton gins, gristmills, a racetrack, and a saloon. It then became a stop for cattle drovers and oxcart freighters from Shreveport, Louisiana, and Porter's Bluff at the end of the 19th century. It reported a population of 49 in the 1930s. Its downtown area moved when the highway between Athens and Canton bypassed the community a mile east of it. A new settlement was founded there. Both townsites were known as Old and New Walton. The two businesses and houses that were in Old Walton in 1936 had disappeared in 1987, while a town hall and the Dr. Theo Blanchard house from 1860 remained. New Walton had a church and several houses in 1936, as well as four businesses, two churches, and a cemetery in 1987. Its population was reported as 35 from 1974 through 2000.

Geography

Education
Walton had its own school in 1890 and had 18 students in 1905. It continued to operate in 1936. Today, Walton is served by the Athens Independent School District.

References

Unincorporated communities in Van Zandt County, Texas
Unincorporated communities in Texas